Managuli , sometimes also called Managoli and Managoli is a village in the southern state of Karnataka, India. It is located in the Basavana Bagevadi taluk of Bijapur district in Karnataka.

Demographics
 India census, Managuli had a population of 34,306 with 17,236 males and 17,070 females.
It is known for growing jower. Recently, Managoli listed as Pattana Panchayath.

See also
 Bijapur district
 Districts of Karnataka

References

External links
 http://Bijapur.nic.in/

Villages in Bijapur district, Karnataka